Nils Donald Ylvisaker (September 23, 1933 – March 20, 2022), often known as Don Ylvisaker, was an American mathematical statistician.

Education and career 
Ylvisaker was born in Minneapolis, Minnesota, USA. He studied at Concordia College and obtained his BA in mathematics and economics in 1954. He then continued his study in mathematics at the University of Nebraska–Lincoln and obtained a MA in 1956. He received his PhD in Statistics from Stanford University in 1960 under the supervision of Emanuel Parzen. Ylvisaker was Parzen's first PhD student at Stanford.

Ylvisaker taught at Columbia University, New York University, and the University of Washington, before moving to University of California, Los Angeles, where he remained until his retirement in 1996. He was one of the founding members of the Department of Statistics at UCLA.

Recognition
Ylvisaker was named a Fellow of the American Statistical Association in 1991.

Personal life 
Besides academic research, Ylvisaker served as a statistical consultant to the California State Lottery. Ylvisaker's wife Anna Ylvisaker (née Ricci) works at the UCLA department of mathematics.

Ylvisaker died on March 20, 2022.

Bibliography

References 

1933 births
2022 deaths
University of Nebraska–Lincoln alumni
Stanford University alumni
University of California, Los Angeles faculty
Concordia College (Moorhead, Minnesota) alumni
Mathematical statisticians
People from Minneapolis
American statisticians
20th-century American mathematicians
University of Washington faculty
New York University faculty
Fellows of the American Statistical Association